"Addicted to the Night" is a song by Lipps Inc. released as a single from their album 4 in 1983. The single reached No. 8 on the Billboard dance/disco chart and No. 78 on the Billboard R&B singles chart. Melanie Rosales would replace Cynthia Johnson on vocals on the single. The single has also appeared on Lipps Inc's compilation album "Funkyworld". In addition, Joel Whitburn included the song in the 1983 edition of his book "Joel Whitburn's Music Yearbook".

References

1983 singles
Lipps Inc. songs